Pierre Labry (1885–1948) was a French stage and film actor. He was active in the French film industry between 1920 and 1948, appearing in more than a hundred films.

Selected filmography

 La croisade (1920)
 Gigolette (1921)
 Le crime du Bouif (1922) - Hexam
 L'enfant des halles (1924) - Marcadion
 Le loup-garou (1924)
 L'heureuse mort (1925) - Le Capitaine Mouche
 Mylord l'Arsouille (1925) - Pépin
 Paris en cinq jours (1926) - L'Américain
 Feu! (1927) - Un marin du yacht
 L'occident (1928) - Le Goff
 Trois jeunes filles nues (1929)
 The Road Is Fine (1930) - Le client de la guinguette
 La femme d'une nuit (1930)
 Le joker (1930)
 Mon coeur incognito (1930)
 Les amours de minuit (1931) - Le policier
 The Indictment (1931) - Peters
 L'anglais tel qu'on le parle (193)
 Gagne ta vie (1931)
 Coeur de lilas (1932) - Charignoul
 Wooden Crosses (1932) - Soldat Bouffioux, le cuistot
 Aces of the Turf (1932)
 In the Name of the Law (1932) - Ludovic
 The Dressmaker of Luneville (1932)
 Fun in the Barracks (1932) - Potiron
 Narcotics (1932) - Le docteur (uncredited)
 Panurge (1932)
 La chanson d'une nuit (1933) - L'inspecteur
 Rivaux de la piste (1933) - Wagmüller
 Don Quixote (1933) - Innkeeper
 The Star of Valencia (1933) - José
 Once Upon a Time (1933)
 La mille et deuxième nuit (1933) - Chief Eunuch
 Un certain monsieur Grant (1933) - Beppo
 Du haut en bas (1933) - Adolf, le fiancé de Milly
 Street Without a Name (1934) - Minche
 A Man Has Been Stolen (1934) - Balafre
 Le Grand Jeu (1934) - Le cantinier
 Cessez le feu (1934) - Lagasse
 Pension Mimosas (1935) - L'hôtelier parisien
 Bibi-la-Purée (1935)
 Aux portes de Paris (1935) - Léopold
 The Decoy (1935) - Le commandant
 Le baron tzigane (1935)
 La mascotte (1935) - L'aubergiste
 Les yeux noirs (1935) - Le noceur
 Madame Angot's Daughter (1935) - Buteux
 L'Équipage (1935) - Marbot
 Carnival in Flanders (1935) - L'aubergiste / The Inn-Keeper
 Les mutinés de l'Elseneur (1936)
 The Volga Boatman (1936) - Kouproff
 Anne-Marie (1936) - Le paysan
 La Peur (1936) - Poudroux
 Confessions of a Cheat (1936) - Maître Morlot / The Notary
 Les gais lurons (1936) - Barman
 Forty Little Mothers (1936) - Bourgeon, le père
 Wells in Flames (1937) - Le marchand de melons
 La chanson du souvenir (1937)
 Gribouille (1937) - L'inspecteur de police (uncredited)
 Lady Killer (1937) - L'imprimeur
 Passeurs d'hommes (1937) - Goliath
 The Alibi (1937) - Le premier inspecteur
 The Puritan (1938)
 Mollenard (1938)
 Nostalgie (1938) - Stable Boy
 People Who Travel (1938)
 Boys' School (1938) - Bernardin
 Alexis gentleman chauffeur (1938) - Un acteur
 Sirocco (1938) - Le chef de la bande
 Katia (1938) - Le sergent de police
 Angelica (1939) - L'officier
 The Five Cents of Lavarede (1939) - Le gardien chef
 The Mayor's Dilemma (1939) - Rameau, le coiffeur
 Entente cordiale (1939) - Un journaliste
 The Last Turning (1939) - Un camionneur
 Second Childhood (1939) - Le patron du café
 Love Cavalcade (1939) - Le baron de Maupré
 Personal Column (1939) - Le danseur (uncredited)
 Tourbillon de Paris (1939)
 Les 3 tambours (1939) - Le boulanger Laporte
 Après Mein Kampf mes crimes (1940) - Ernst Roehm
 The Acrobat (1941) - Dubier
 The Last of the Six (1941) - L'inspecteur Picard (uncredited)
 Montmartre (1941) - Le cafetier
 Caprices (1942) - Le portier de l'Imperator
 Pension Jonas (1942) - Mouche
 Le journal tombe à cinq heures (1942) - Romain (uncredited)
 The Guardian Angel (1942) - Jaminet
 The Lost Woman (1942) - Le cabaretier
 At Your Command, Madame (1942) - Le mécanicien-chef
 Les Visiteurs du Soir (1942) - Le seigneur
 It Happened at the Inn (1943) - Minain
 Captain Fracasse (1943) - Hérode / Erodo
 Shop Girls of Paris (1943) - Achille Vingard - Le serrurier (uncredited)
 Arlette and Love (1943) - Jules - le domestique
 Jeannou (1943)
 Vautrin (1943) - Paccard
 Mahlia the Mestiza (1943)
Farandole (1945)
 The Bellman (1945) - Gros-Guillaume - l'aubergiste
 The Last Penny (1946) - Le luthier
 The Misfortunes of Sophie (1946)
 Monsieur Grégoire s'évade (1946) - L'aubergiste
 Trente et quarante (1946) - Le maître-nageur
 The Queen's Necklace (1946) - Hubert (uncredited)
 Devil and the Angel (1946) - Gardel - un Inspecteur
 Les gosses mènent l'enquête (1947) - Fiellat
 Passionnelle (1947) - Le brigadier
 Histoire de chanter (1947) - L'agent
 Les aventures de Casanova (1947) - Le moine
 The Unknown Singer (1947) - Le machiniste
 Fantômas (1947) - M. Paul
 L'idole (1948) - Bender
 Scandals of Clochemerle (1948) - Nicolas
 Emile the African (1948) - Le patron
 The Pretty Miller Girl (1948) - Le cocher (uncredited)
 L'échafaud peut attendre (1949) - Le patron du café (final film role)

References

Bibliography
 Capua, Michelangelo. Anatole Litvak: The Life and Films. McFarland, 2015.

External links

1885 births
1948 deaths
French male stage actors
French male film actors
Male actors from Paris